Ricaud may refer to the following places in France:

Ricaud, Aude, a commune in the Aude department 
Ricaud, Hautes-Pyrénées, a commune in the Hautes-Pyrénées department